Rowlett Rutland was a British company, and is now a brand of commercial-oriented toasters (for restaurants).

History
The first toasters were designed by Ted Rutland. It was known as the Rowlett Catering Appliances Ltd, being incorporated on 29 January 1965. In January 2002, the company became known as Rowlett Rutland. The company was family-owned until 2016.

Harold Edward Rutland died on 17 August 2004, aged 90.

Products
 Conveyor toasters
 Hot plates
 Panini grills

Structure
The company was headquartered in Little Bookham in Surrey, near Bookham railway station from 2002; it had been in Twickenham from 1957, and previously was at Burnt Oak. In 2016, the company was taken over, and the production was moved in December 2017.

Production
The company is not a high-volume operation, making around fifty toasters per day. It sells to around 20 countries, with 38% of products being exported.

See also
 Blue Seal (company) of the West Midlands
 Classeq of Staffordshire
 Dualit of West Sussex
 Star Manufacturing of Smithville, Tennessee

References

External links
Official Website

British brands
Catering and food service companies of the United Kingdom
Companies based in Surrey
Cooking appliance brands
Manufacturing companies of England
Home appliance manufacturers